Pedro Henrique Vittori El Kadri (born 3 September 1995) is a Brazilian professional footballer who plays as a centre-back.

Career

Brazil 
Having begun his career at local club Londrina, Kadri moved to Paranavaí.

Portugal 
Kadri moved to Portugal in 2016, joining Campeonato de Portugal (third tier) side Louletano. He remained one season, before moving to Farense ahead of the 2017–18 season; his contract was renewed for a further year in June 2019. In January 2020, Kadri joined Oliveirense in the Liga Portugal 2 (second tier), with Farense keeping a percentage of a future sale.

Lebanon 
On 10 January 2022, Lebanese Premier League side Ansar announced the signing of Kadri. However, after his contract was terminated shortly after, he signed for cross-city rivals Nejmeh on 26 February.

Personal life 
Kadri has Italian and Arab origins. He cited former Brazilian defender Lúcio as a reference and idol.

References

External links 
 Profile at U.D. Oliveirense
 
 

1995 births
Living people
Brazilian people of Italian descent
Brazilian people of Arab descent
Sportspeople from Londrina
Brazilian footballers
Association football central defenders
Londrina Esporte Clube players
Atlético Clube Paranavaí players
Louletano D.C. players
S.C. Farense players
U.D. Oliveirense players
Al Ansar FC players
Nejmeh SC players
Campeonato de Portugal (league) players
Liga Portugal 2 players
Lebanese Premier League players
Brazilian expatriate footballers
Brazilian expatriate sportspeople in Lebanon
Expatriate footballers in Lebanon